The ECWA Territory Championship is a professional wrestling championship created and promoted by the East Coast Wrestling Association (ECWA) promotion. The current  champion is Abs Armstrong who won the title on October 22nd 2022 on an Episode of ECWA Saturday Morning Slam.

Title history 
The  Inaugural and current champion is Matt Vertigo, who defeated LA Vin and Steve Scott in a three-way match on the May 1, 2021 episode of ECWA 25th Annual Super 8 Tournament in Morganville, NJ.

References

External links 
 ECWA Territory Championship

East Coast Wrestling Association championships
Regional professional wrestling championships